Wyszeslawa Sviatoslavna of Kiev (b. ca. 1047? – d. aft. 1089), was a Kievan Rus' princess and member of the Rurikid dynasty and by marriage Duchess and later Queen of Poland.

She was the eldest child and only daughter of Sviatoslav II, Prince of Chernihiv and later Grand Prince of Kiev, by his wife Kilikia, probably member of the House of Dithmarschen.

Life
The chronicler Jan Długosz and other authors reported her parentage. She was certainly married to Bolesław II the Bold, Duke of Poland before 1069, because in that year their only child, Mieszko, was born. She was probably crowned Queen of Poland with her husband on Christmas Day of 1076 in the Gniezno Cathedral by the Archbishop Bogumił.

In 1079, together with her husband and son she was exiled in Hungary. Two years later (ca. 1081/82) Bolesław II died under mysterious circumstances, probably by poison. In 1086, together with her son Mieszko, Wyszesława returned to Poland. According to Gallus Anonymus, she participated in the funeral of her son, who was poisoned in 1089. This is the last mention of the wife of Bolesław II the Bold; her fate remains unknown. 

Modern historians, led by Oswald Balzer in his Genealogia Piastów (1895), refuted the name and origins of Bolesław II's wife. They stated that she likely had a German or Russian origin. Also, there is the theory that the Queen Agnes (Agnes Regina) whose obituary is recorded in Zwiefalten was the wife of Bolesław II; it is also believed that she belonged to the Přemyslid dynasty.

References

1040s births
1087 deaths
Rurik dynasty
Polish queens consort
Kievan Rus' princesses
11th-century Rus' people
11th-century Rus' women
11th-century Polish people
11th-century Polish women